United Nations Security Council resolution 870, adopted unanimously on 1 October 1993, after reaffirming Resolution 743 (1992) and subsequent resolutions relating to the United Nations Protection Force (UNPROFOR), the council, acting under Chapter VII of the United Nations Charter, extended UNPROFOR's mandate for additional period terminating 5 October 1993.

The council reiterated its determination to ensure the security of UNPROFOR and its freedom of movement for all its missions in Bosnia and Herzegovina and Croatia.

See also
 Bosnian War
 Breakup of Yugoslavia
 Croatian War of Independence
 List of United Nations Security Council Resolutions 801 to 900 (1993–1994)
 Yugoslav Wars

References

External links
 
Text of the Resolution at undocs.org

 0870
 0870
1993 in Yugoslavia
1993 in Bosnia and Herzegovina
1993 in Croatia
 0870
 0870
 0870
October 1993 events